Katherine Porter (1941) is an American artist. Born in Cedar Rapids, Iowa in 1941, Porter is considered one of the most important contemporary artists associated with Maine. She resists categorization.
Through the medium of painting and drawing her visually stunning canvases convey the conflict inherent in life. She expresses her ideas with a visual vocabulary that is "geometric and gestural, abstract and figurative, decorative and raw, lyric and muscular."

Porter has shown twice in the Whitney Biennial and solo exhibitions at the Knoedler Gallery in London, the Nina Nielsen Gallery in Boston, and the Andre Emmerich and Salander-O'Reilly Galleries in New York. Her work is in the collections of the Metropolitan Museum of Art, Museum of Modern Art, Whitney Museum of American Art, Museum of Fine Arts in Boston, Virginia Museum of Fine Arts, and the Tel Aviv Museum in Jerusalem. She currently resides in Maine.

Early life and education 
Katherine Louanne Pavlis was born in Cedar Rapids, Iowa, and grew up in rural Iowa. Her birth date has been given variously as September 11, 1944 and 1941.  She moved to Colorado in the late 1950s, studying at Colorado College in Colorado Springs, Colorado from 1959-1961. She also studied at Boston University, where her teachers included Conger Metcalf and Walter Tandy Murch.  She received her Bachelor of Arts degree in 1963.

While living in Colorado Katherine met and married Stephen Porter, a sculptor and the child of photographer Eliot Porter and his wife Aline Kilham. Stephen and Katherine were married on January 28, 1962, and divorced in 1967.
As a couple they traveled to South America, spending time in the Galapagos Islands, Ecuador, Chile, Argentina, and Peru. Katherine Porter's concern for the political and social conflict in South America is shown in many of her works, including Swann's Song (1975).

Career
Porter was active in Boston's artistic community during much of the 1960s. She was part of The Studio Coalition in Boston’s South End, combining artistic and political concerns.
In 1971 she held her first solo exhibitions, and sold her first work to collector Betty Parsons.

In 1972 Porter moved to New Mexico, where she lived until 1976. 
During this time she continued to exhibit in New England, and by 1979, she had returned to Boston.
During this period, works such as her Swann's Song (1975) built upon a grid to achieves three-dimensional effects.
 
She later moved to Maine. By 2017, she was living in Rhinebeck, New York. She is considered one of New England's significant painters.

Katherine Porter received an honorary doctorate from Colby College in 1982 and an honorary doctorate from Bowdoin College in Maine in 1992.

Style

Bibliography

See also
 Boston Expressionism

References

External links 
 
 Katherine Porter works in the Museum of Modern Art, New York
 Katherine Porter works in the Metropolitan Museum of Art, New York
 Katherine Porter works in the Whitney Museum of American Art, New York
 Katherine Porter works in the Museum of Fine Arts, Boston

1941 births
Living people
20th-century American painters
Colorado College alumni
20th-century American women artists
People from Cedar Rapids, Iowa
Artists from Maine
21st-century American women